Amethyst is a given name derived from a semi-precious violet variety of quartz that is also used to make jewelry. Ancient Greeks believed the stone prevented intoxication. An amethyst is also the birthstone for people born in February.

The name may refer to:

Females 
Amethyst Amelia Kelly, Australian recording artist known by the stage name Iggy Azalea (born 1990)

Males 
Amethyst Bradley Ralani (born 1987), South African football player who plays for the Mamelodi Sundowns in the Premier Soccer League

Reference 

English-language feminine given names
Given names derived from gemstones